Mundo Novo is the southernmost municipality in the Brazilian state of Mato Grosso do Sul. Its population was 18,473 (2020) and its area is 479.327 km².

References

Municipalities in Mato Grosso do Sul
Populated places established in 1973